Fletcherana leucoxyla is a moth of the family Geometridae. It was first described by Edward Meyrick in 1899. It is endemic to the Hawaiian island of Kauai.

The background coloration is nearly white, while the intensity of the markings varies
considerably.

External links

Larentiinae
Endemic moths of Hawaii